The M1971 helmet (Also known as M71) is a military steel combat helmet used by Switzerland from its formal introduction in 1971 until its gradual replacement by the Schuberth B826 (known in Switzerland as the Schutzhelm 04 (in German) or casque de protection balistique 04 (in French)).

Design

The shell is of a near hemispherical shape with prominent flares on both sides and stamped in 1.15mm steel. It includes four rivets where the liner attaches to the shell. The shell is painted a matte dark olive green with a textured finish. Towards the rear two vent holes are present around the same spot and construction as the previous M18 and M18/40 models. 

The liner itself consists of a metal band running the inside circumference with a foam spacer between it and the shell. Attached to the band are four leather pads, affixed to the rear of these is a leather pouch where simple pieces of thick felt are used for sizing to one's head. A drawstring connects all four pads for further sizing. The chin strap is a four-point setup with the straps attaching to the shell in the same place the liner itself does. 

Both chin straps connecting with a simple hook and catch system. A cover in TAZ 83 pattern camouflage was produced for the helmet, with four hooks to attach to the shell and a pull string to size it accordingly.

References

External links

Combat helmets of Switzerland
Military equipment introduced in the 1970s